The BET Award for Viewer's Choice Award is determined by the fans. The all-time winner in this category is Lil Wayne with four wins. Drake is the most nominated artist with eighteen nominations.

Winners and nominees
Winners are listed first and highlighted in bold.

2000s

2010s

2020s

Multiple wins and nominations

Wins

 4 wins
 Lil Wayne

 3 wins
 Beyoncé
 Chris Brown

 2 wins
 B2K
 Drake
 Megan Thee Stallion
 Nicki Minaj
 Rihanna

Nominations

 18 nominations
 Drake

 10 nominations
 Beyoncé
 Chris Brown
 Lil Wayne

 6 nominations
 Jay-Z
 Nicki Minaj

 5 nominations
 Rihanna

 4 nominations
 Cardi B
 T.I.

 3 nominations
 Bow Wow
 Missy Elliott
 Alicia Keys
 Kendrick Lamar
 Megan Thee Stallion
 Kanye West
 The Weeknd

 2 nominations
 B2K
 Ciara
 Keyshia Cole
 DaBaby
 Destiny's Child
 Future
 DJ Khaled
 Lil' Jon
 Miguel
 Mindless Behavior
 Ne-Yo
 R. Kelly
 Rae Sremmurd
 Busta Rhymes
 Roddy Ricch
 Trey Songz
 Soulja Boy
 T-Pain
 Young Thug

References

BET Awards